Konstantinos Triaridis (Greek: Κωνσταντίνος Τριαρίδης; (15 May 1937 – 27 June 2012) was a Greek politician who served as Minister for Macedonia-Thrace from 1993 to 1996.

References

1930s births
2012 deaths
PASOK politicians
Academic staff of the Aristotle University of Thessaloniki
People from Kilkis